This article is the list of international matches of the South Korea national under-23 football team from 2000 to 2009.

Results by year

Under-23 matches

2000

Source:

2002

Source:

2003

Source:

2004

Source:

2006

Source:

2007

Source:

2008

Source:

Other matches

See also
 South Korea national under-23 football team results

References

External links
 South Korea U-23 (Olympic) Matches - Details 2000-2004 at YANSFIELD
 Men's U-23 Squads & Results at KFA

2000